The men's 800 metre freestyle competition at the 2002 Pan Pacific Swimming Championships took place on August 25 at the Yokohama International Swimming Pool.  The last champion was Grant Hackett of Australia, in 1997. This event was not held in 1999.

This event was a timed-final where each swimmer swam just once.

Records
Prior to this competition, the existing world and Pan Pacific records were as follows:

Results
All times are in minutes and seconds.

References

2002 Pan Pacific Swimming Championships